Sibu District is an administrative district in Sibu Division, Sarawak, Malaysia covering a total area of 2229.8 km2. It can be divided into Sibu Town area (129.5 km2) and the rural areas (2,100.3 km2). The satellite township of Sibu Jaya (26 km away from the Sibu city) is included in the rural areas. Sibu District is under the purview of Sibu District Office located at Sibu Islamic Complex, Sibu City. There are currently two local authorities namely Sibu Municipal Council (SMC) and Sibu Rural District Council (SRDC) that administers Sibu City and Sibu rural areas respectively.

Demography
There has been a marginal growth of Sibu District population of 2.36% from 1991 to 2000. Meanwhile, from 2000 to 2010, there is a marginal growth of 1.53%.
{| class="wikitable" style="text-align: center;"
! Year
| 1991 || 2000 ||2010
|-
! Totalpopulation
| 166,894 || 206,297 || 240,165
|-
|}

City and towns

Sibu
James Brooke built a fort in Sibu in 1862. In 1901, 1,118 Fuzhounese settlers migrated to Sibu. Today, Sibu is the largest city by the Rajang River.

Sibu Jaya

Sibu Jaya is located at 26 km away from Sibu. and 1 km away from Sibu Airport. It is a joint development project between AmCorp Corporation Sdn Bhd and Sarawak Housing and Development Corporation. It was originally developed as a satellite township to Sibu in 1995. The city is expected to be completed in 2023.

Durin
Pesta Rakyat Durin (Durin Peoples' festival) is held at Durin bazaar every year. Durin Bridge connecting the town of Sibu with Durin bazaar was opened in 2006.

Kemuyang
Kemuyang area is located 23 km away from the town of Sibu. Sibu Kemuyang Youth Camp started operation 1999. Sibu Pastoral Centre is also located here.

Rantau Panjang
Rantau Panjang Integrated Shipyard Shipbuilding Industrial Zone was constructed in 2003.

Pasai Siong
The largest Covid-19 cluster in Sarawak was detected here. The cluster lasted from December 2020 to April 2021, infecting a total of 2,693 people across ten other districts in Sarawak, resulting in 29 deaths.

Climate

References